Nañuhuaico (possibly from Quechua ñañu thin (cylindrical objects), slim, wayq'u brook, "thin brook") is a  mountain in the Vilcabamba mountain range in the Andes of Peru. It is located in the Cusco Region, La Convención Province, Vilcabamba District. Nañuhuaico lies northwest of a mountain named Soirococha and north of a lake of that name, northeast of Panta.

Nañuhuaico (erroneously spelled Nunahuayco) is also the name of a stream which originates north of the mountain. It is a left affluent of the Hatun Wayq'u ("big brook") in the north whose waters flow to the Apurímac River as a right tributary.

References

Mountains of Peru
Mountains of Cusco Region